Dimple Yadav (born 15 January 1978) is an Indian politician. She is the incumbent Member of Parliament from Mainpuri since December 2022, and has earlier served as Member of the Lok Sabha for two terms from Kannauj. She is the wife of Samajwadi Party president and former Chief Minister of Uttar Pradesh, Akhilesh Yadav. 

Dimple is the daughter-in-law of Late Mulayam Singh Yadav, former Defence Minister of India, former Chief Minister of Uttar Pradesh and founder-patron of the Samajwadi Party.

Early life and education
Dimple Yadav was born on 15 January 1978 at Pune, Maharashtra. She is the second of three daughters of retired Indian Army Col. Ram Chandra Singh Rawat and Champa Rawat. Her family is originally from Uttarakhand. She was educated in Pune, Bathinda and Andaman and Nicobar island and Army Public School, Nehru road, Lucknow. She graduated in commerce from Lucknow University.

Personal life

Dimple Rawat met Akhilesh Yadav when she was a student. Originally Akhilesh's family was opposed to their marriage, but they agreed after Akhilesh's grandmother Murti Devi approved. The pair got married on 24 November 1999 when she was aged 21. Guests at her wedding included movie stars, Amitabh Bachchan and Rajesh Khanna.
The couple have two daughters Tina and Aditi and a son Arjun.

Political career
Yadav unsuccessfully contested the by-election for the Lok Sabha constituency of Firozabad in 2009 against actor turned politician Raj Babbar. The by-election was caused by her husband winning a seat in the May 2009 general elections both in this constituency as well as in Kannauj and taking up his seat from there. She was elected unopposed from the Kannauj constituency to the Lok Sabha in 2012, after her husband caused another by-election by vacating the seat to enter the Uttar Pradesh legislative council.

Dimple became the 44th person in the country and only the fourth in Uttar Pradesh since the independence of India to be elected unopposed. This situation arose when two candidates, Dashrath Singh Shankwar (Samyukt Samajwadi Dal) and Sanju Katiyar (Independent), withdrew their nominations. Bharatiya Janata Party and Indian National Congress had not nominated any candidates for the by-election; though the BJP clarified later that their candidate missed his train so he failed to reach in time to file his nomination.

This made her the first woman from Uttar Pradesh to elected unopposed in a Lok Sabha by-election, and second person after Purshottam Das Tandon's election from Allahabad West in 1952. She became the only woman MP whose husband was Chief Minister, and also one whose father-in-law was also a member of the same House.

Dimple retained Kannauj Lok Sabha seat in 2014 Indian general election. She contested as a joint candidate of the Samajwadi Party and Bahujan Samaj Party in 2019 Indian general election from Kannauj, but lost to BJP with a margin of more than 10,000 votes.

After demise of her father-in-law, former Minister of Defence and Chief Minister of Uttar Pradesh Mulayam Singh Yadav on 10th October 2022 as he was the Member of Parliament from Mainpuri the seat became vacant and caused By- Election there. 
Mainpuri is the prestigious seat for Mulayam Singh Yadav’s family and Samajwadi Party.
As Mainpuri Lok Sabha constituency is home field of Yadav family, Samajwadi Party chose her as candidate for Mainpuri Lok Sabha by-election to save home fort.

Dimple along her spouse former Chief Minister of Uttar Pradesh Akhilesh Yadav and her uncle-in-law Shivpal Singh Yadav campaigned and organised multiple public meetings and nukkad sabha in constituency as a result she retained her father-in-law’s traditional seat by defeating BJP’s candidate with over 2.88 lakh of votes.
Along with victory she also became the first elected woman representative from Mainpuri Lok Sabha constituency.

References

External links
 Official biographical sketch in Parliament of India website
 

Living people
1979 births
Samajwadi Party politicians
People from Kannauj district
India MPs 2009–2014
Lok Sabha members from Uttar Pradesh
India MPs 2014–2019
Dimple
Women in Uttar Pradesh politics
21st-century Indian women politicians
People from Pune
University of Lucknow alumni